This is a list of Ethiopian regions and the two chartered cities of Addis Ababa and Dire Dawa by Human Development Index as of 2023 with data for the year 2021.

See also

References 

Ethiopia
Human Development Index
Ethiopia, Human Development Index